Lee Yun-hui (born 5 September 1986) is a South Korean rower. She competed in the women's single sculls event at the 2004 Summer Olympics.

References

1986 births
Living people
South Korean female rowers
Olympic rowers of South Korea
Rowers at the 2004 Summer Olympics
Sportspeople from North Chungcheong Province